Uzzell is a surname. Notable people with the surname include:

Harry Uzzell (1883–1960), Welsh international rugby union player
Janeen Uzzell, American mechanical engineer and business executive
John Uzzell (born 1959), British footballer
Kevin Uzzell, British pocket billiards player
Ruth Uzzell, (1880-1945), British trade unionist